39MP3 is an archaeological site in McPherson County, South Dakota.  It consists of a panel of rock art, on which designs have been pecked.  The designs on this panel appear to resemble heads of bison, a theme echoed in other rock art panels in the area.

The site was listed on the National Register of Historic Places in 1993.

See also
National Register of Historic Places listings in McPherson County, South Dakota

References

Archaeological sites on the National Register of Historic Places in South Dakota
McPherson County, South Dakota
National Register of Historic Places in McPherson County, South Dakota